Carlos Javier Cuéllar Jiménez (born 23 August 1981) is a Spanish former professional footballer. Mainly a central defender, he could also operate as a right-back.

Club career

Early career
Born in Madrid, Cuéllar represented Internacional de Argibay, DAV Santa Ana, CD Pegaso and AD San Federico as a youth. In 2000, after a short trial at Atlético Madrid, he was signed by CD Numancia, being immediately loaned to CD Calahorra in Segunda División B.

Cuéllar returned to the Soria after his loan expired, and made his professional debut on 23 September 2001, starting and being booked in a 1–2 away loss against Xerez CD in the Segunda División championship. He scored his first professional goal on 12 May of the following year, netting the last in a 4–0 home routing of Racing de Ferrol.

Osasuna
On 29 August 2003 Cuéllar signed a three-year deal with CA Osasuna in La Liga. He made his debut in the competition on 19 October, playing the full 90 minutes in a 2–1 home win against Real Murcia.

Cuéllar spent his first two seasons as a backup to César Cruchaga and Josetxo, but still renewed his contract with the club on 1 December 2005. He became an important part of the Javier Aguirre side that reached the Copa del Rey final in 2005 and finished fourth in the league in the following season, thus qualifying for the UEFA Champions League.

As Osasuna "dropped" to the UEFA Cup Cuéllar, by then not an automatic first-choice in the league, played seven times in European competition, as the Navarrese reached the semifinals. He scored twice, notably in the 3–0 win at the BayArena against Bayer 04 Leverkusen in April 2007, which was the fastest goal of the tournament that season.

Rangers

Scottish club Rangers made two offers for Cuéllar in June 2007 that were rejected by Osasuna, but the eventual transfer was completed on 5 July, for a fee of £2.37 million. He signed a four-year contract, worth a reported £15,000 per week, and made his competitive Rangers debut against FK Zeta on 31 July 2007, in a 2–0 victory. After impressing early in the season, Cuéllar was awarded the Scottish Premier League Player of the Month award for August 2007. He scored his first Rangers goal on 1 September 2007, during a 4–0 victory over Gretna.

Cuéllar continued to play well for Rangers, but he was sent off during a critical Old Firm match for handling a goal-bound Shunsuke Nakamura shot. The resultant penalty kick was saved by Allan McGregor, but Celtic went on to win the match and the league title. As personal reward for what was an outstanding season, Cuéllar collected the Scottish Premier League Player of the Year award and was named the Scottish Football Writers Associations Player of the Year. At the event, he was quoted as saying "I want to stay at Rangers for life." Following the departure of Thomas Buffel during the summer, Cuéllar was handed the number 4 shirt for the 2008–09 season, but never wore it as he was injured for the first game against Falkirk and transferred to Aston Villa just days later. He made a total of 65 appearances for Rangers, a club record for a single season, and scored 5 goals.

Aston Villa
On 12 August 2008, English Premier League side Aston Villa signed Cuéllar in a deal worth £7.8 million on a four-year contract. Villa's offer had triggered a release-clause in Cuéllar's Rangers contract. He was given the squad number 24, which he also wore at his previous club. His move to Aston Villa 'surprised' and 'disappointed' manager Walter Smith.

Cuéllar made his official first team début on 18 September in the 3–1 UEFA Cup first round victory against PFC Litex Lovech in Bulgaria. He made his first league appearance for Aston Villa in the West Midlands Derby match against West Bromwich Albion on 21 September. Cuéllar came on as a late substitute in a match which Aston Villa won 2–1. His first league start came against Portsmouth on 19 October 2008, where he however operated as a right back. Most of Cuéllar's league appearances during his first season were in that position, due to the good form in the central partnership of Curtis Davies and Martin Laursen.

Cuéllar performed for Villa at the 2009 Peace Cup in his homeland. He went on to score the winning penalty in the final where Juventus went down 4–3 in a shootout to Villa.

He scored his first goal for Villa against Bolton Wanderers on 7 November 2009 at Villa Park. His second goal for the Villa came against Manchester United on 10 February 2010, opening the scoring with a header which was 1–1. In the third round of a FA Cup, Cuéllar scored a header in a 3–1 win over Blackburn Rovers on 2 January 2010.

Aston Villa accepted an offer from Cuéllar's old club Rangers in the summer of 2011 but the player was injured and the move broke down. In February 2012, Cuéllar announced that he would be willing to play anywhere on the pitch if it was good for the team. He then started against Manchester City at left back ahead of Stephen Warnock in a Premier League match.

On 6 May 2012, following a 1–1 draw with Tottenham Hotspur that confirmed Aston Villa's Premier League survival, Cuéllar announced via his official Twitter and Facebook pages that he would leave the club at the end of his contract in the summer of 2012. Cuéllar called his final home game "one of the saddest days". After his release, Cuéllar said he was keen to stay at England despite an option to move back to Spain.

Sunderland

On 2 July 2012, Sunderland confirmed the free signing of Carlos Cuéllar on a two-year contract following his departure from Aston Villa, signed by his former Villa manager Martin O'Neill. He made his debut on 18 August in a goalless draw against Arsenal and scored his first goal for the club on 18 November in a 3–1 victory at Fulham.

At the end of the 2013–14 season, he was released by the club.

Norwich City
Cuéllar signed a one-year deal with Championship side Norwich City on 20 August 2014. He made his debut six days later in Norwich's League Cup match against Crawley Town. Cuéllar conceded an own goal in the 55th minute, but Norwich won the match 3–1. Cuéllar was released by Norwich a few days after the club secured promotion back to the Premier League, having made 10 appearances for the Canaries.

Almería
On 10 August 2015, Cuéllar signed a one-year deal with UD Almería in the second level, mainly as a replacement to Levante UD-bound Ángel Trujillo.

Maccabi Petah Tikva
On 12 August 2016, Cuéllar signed a short-term deal with Maccabi Petah Tikva for an undisclosed fee.

Ironi Kiryat Shmona
On 22 May 2017, Cuéllar signed a one-year deal with Ironi Kiryat Shmona.

Beitar Jerusalem
On 15 May 2018, Cuéllar joined Beitar Jerusalem, with his teammate Itamar Nitzan. He was released from the team on 16 August 2018.

Bnei Yehuda
On 7 September 2018, Cuéllar signed with Bnei Yehuda. He left the club in the summer 2019 and announced his retirement on 17 October 2019.

Personal life
In December 2015, Cuéllar became a vegan for health reasons. He made this decision after watching the documentary Forks Over Knives.

Career statistics

Honours
Osasuna
Copa del Rey runner-up: 2004–05

Rangers
Scottish Cup: 2007–08
Scottish League Cup: 2007–08
UEFA Cup runner-up: 2007–08

Aston Villa
Football League Cup runner-up: 2009–10

Bnei Yehuda
Israel State Cup: 2018–19

Individual
Scottish Premier League Player of the Year: 2007–08
SFWA Footballer of the Year: 2007–08

References

External links

1981 births
Living people
Footballers from the Community of Madrid
Spanish footballers
Association football defenders
La Liga players
Segunda División players
Segunda División B players
CD Numancia players
CA Osasuna players
UD Almería players
Scottish Premier League players
Rangers F.C. players
Premier League players
Aston Villa F.C. players
Sunderland A.F.C. players
Norwich City F.C. players
Maccabi Petah Tikva F.C. players
Hapoel Ironi Kiryat Shmona F.C. players
Beitar Jerusalem F.C. players
Bnei Yehuda Tel Aviv F.C. players
Spanish expatriate footballers
Expatriate footballers in Scotland
Expatriate footballers in England
Expatriate footballers in Israel
Spanish expatriate sportspeople in England
Spanish expatriate sportspeople in Scotland
Spanish expatriate sportspeople in Israel